The Bench of Counts of Westphalia, a historical title of nobility, was one of the four comital benches of the Reichstag in the Holy Roman Empire. Collectively, the Counts exercised one vote. Territories which belonged to the Bench before 1582 (the date from which admission to the Reichstag was administered by strict rules) are known as "Old Counts," and those added afterwards are known as "New Counts," in a manner exercised similarly by the College of Princes. A state could have the right to vote in the bench if they ruled an Imperial Estate with a right to vote in the Bench, or if they ruled a significant immediate territory which a right to vote in the Bench.

List of Estates of Old Counts of Westphalia

    * territory was created out of a prior state, therefore is not a New Count

List of Estates of New Counts of Westphalia

References